Euchloron is a monotypic moth genus of the family Sphingidae first described by Jean Baptiste Boisduval in 1875. Its only species, Euchloron megaera, the verdant hawk, is known from most of Africa and Yemen. It is a migratory species.

The length of the forewings is 40–50 mm and the wingspan is 96–121 mm. The body and forewings are bright deep green. The forewings have a black and white spot at the base, a dark brown spot near the tornus and one or two at the costa. The hindwings are orange yellow with an irregular brown margin turning greenish near the tornus. There is a black spot at the base and a large, elongated black spot from inner margin to vein five.

The larvae feed on Ampelopsis quinquefolia, Vigna and Cissus species.

Subspecies
Euchloron megaera megaera (very common and widely distributed in most habitats in most of Africa south of the Sahara, and Grand Comore, except high mountains and very arid areas. It is also not found in the western Cape)
Euchloron megaera asiatica Haxaire & Melichar, 2009 (Yemen)
Euchloron megaera lacordairei (Boisduval, 1833) (Madagascar, Mayotte, Mohéli and Anjouan)
Euchloron megaera orhanti Haxaire, 2010 (Réunion)
Euchloron megaera serrai Darge, 1970 (São Tomé)

References

External links
 - with images
 Photos on the sites «Ianni Butterfly Enterprises» (United States) and Philippe Blanchot (France)

Macroglossini
Monotypic moth genera
Moths described in 1758
Moths of Africa
Moths of the Comoros
Moths of Madagascar
Moths of Mauritius
Moths of Réunion
Moths of São Tomé and Príncipe
Moths of the Middle East
Taxa named by Jean Baptiste Boisduval
Taxa named by Carl Linnaeus